Life TV (known as Liberty TV until 5 October 2001) was a British television channel owned and operated by Life TV Media. It launched in October 2000 and was the first television channel from the company. After its launch Life TV Media also launched three other channels, Life 24, Life Showcase TV and Life One.

On 18 April 2005 Life TV Media launched a two-hour time shifted service for Life TV.

On 20 August 2007 Life TV and two of its sister channels were closed down and integrated into the channel Life One. The Channel Four Television Corporation bought their three Sky Digital EPG slots and moved their own channels to the slots.

Satellite television
Television channels in the United Kingdom
Defunct television channels in the United Kingdom